Tiberius Claudius Nero (c. 82 – 33 BC) was a Roman politician, senator, and praetor who lived in the last century of the Roman Republic.

He was notable for being the first husband of Livia, before she divorced him to marry the future emperor Augustus, and the biological father of the second Roman emperor Tiberius.

Ancestry

Nero was a member of the republican Claudia gens of Rome. He was a descendant of the censor Appius Claudius Caecus. Nero was the son of Tiberius Claudius Nero and his mother was a descendant of the Claudian gens. Nero had a sister called Claudia, who married the prefect Quintus Volusius.

Political career

Under Julius Caesar 
Nero had served as a quaestor to Julius Caesar in 48 BC, commanding his fleet in the Alexandrian War. Having achieved victory over the Egyptian navy, he was rewarded with a priesthood. Julius Caesar had sent Nero to create Roman colonies in Gaul and in other provinces.

Assassination of Julius Caesar 
Despite his service with Julius Caesar, Nero was an Optimate at heart. After the murder of Julius Caesar in 44 BC, when it seemed that the assassins were triumphant, he suggested that they be rewarded for their services to the state. However, due to his previous alliance with the Roman dictator, Nero was allowed to be elected praetor in 42 BC.

Second Triumvirate 
Shortly afterwards, the Second Triumvirate began to break down, causing a dangerous situation in Rome as the triumvirs went to battle with each other. Nero was forced to choose sides and in his distrust of Octavian, he cast his lot with Mark Antony. In 41 BC, he fled Rome with Livia and Tiberius in tow, joining Antony's brother Lucius in Perusia. Perusia was besieged by Octavian's men by the time Nero arrived, and when the town fell in 40 BC, he was forced to flee first to Praeneste, and then Naples. In 40 BC, Octavian and Mark Antony finally reconciled.

In Naples, Nero tried in vain to raise a slave battalion against Octavian and then took refuge with Sextus Pompey, who was then acting as a pirate leader in Sicily. Nero with his family joined Mark Antony soon after in Achaea.
 
After three years of fleeing from Octavian, Nero returned to Rome with Livia and the younger Tiberius, aged 3. Octavian immediately after catching sight of Livia, fell in love with her, despite the fact that she was still married. Octavian was married to Scribonia, with whom he had a daughter called Julia, now known as Julia the Elder.  Octavian and Scribonia divorced.  Around this time Livia was also pregnant and despite this, Nero was persuaded or forced by Octavian to divorce Livia. Nero and Livia's second son was born in early 38 BC and he was named Decimus Claudius Drusus, which was later changed to Nero Claudius Drusus. Using a cognomen such as Nero as a first name was unusual, as was the prominence given to his maternal lineage in adopting Drusus as his cognomen. Octavian and Livia married on January 17, waiving the traditional waiting period. Nero was present at their wedding, giving Livia away "just as a father would". As agreed, Nero took his sons to his home, where they were raised and educated.

Death
Nero died in 33 BC. After his death, his sons went to live with their mother and stepfather. The younger Tiberius, aged 9, delivered his funeral eulogy on the Rostra in Rome. When the future Roman emperor Tiberius celebrated his coming of age, he staged two gladiatorial contests; one was held at the Forum in memory of his father and the other at the amphitheatre in memory of his grandfather Drusus.

Personal life
Around the time Nero was elected praetor in 42 BC, he married his relative Livia Drusilla, whose father Marcus Livius Drusus Claudianus was from the same gens. His son of the same name was born November 16, 42 BC, at Fondi Italy. Elaine Fantham belives it is likely that Nero had been married before he wed Livia, as he was already looking for a wife in 50 BC when he approached Cicero to marry his daughter Tullia.

Notes

References

80s BC births
33 BC deaths
1st-century BC Romans
Ancient Roman generals
Ancient Roman politicians
Tiberius
Roman Republican praetors
Roman quaestors
Ancient Roman admirals
Family of Tiberius